The Goya Award for Best Fictional Short Film is one of the Goya Awards, Spain's principal national film awards. From 1989 to 1991 there was only one award for short films under the name Best Short Film ("Mejor cortometraje"), since 1992 it has been presented under its current for fictional short films.

The short films Esposados (1996), That Wasn't Me (2012), Timecode (2016) and Mother (2017) have received a nomination for the Academy Award for Best Live Action Short Film. At the European Film Awards, the films The Runner (2015) and Suc de Síndria (2019) have been nominated to Best Short Film while Timecode (2016) won the award.

Winners and nominees

1980s
 Best Short Film

1990s

 Best Fictional Short Film

2000s

2010s

2020s

References

External links
Official site

Fictional short film
Short film awards